"Got to Get It" is the debut solo single of Sisqó from Dru Hill featuring Make It Hot. It is the first single from Sisqó's debut solo album, Unleash the Dragon. The single was fairly successful on the charts. It peaked at number 40 on the US Billboard Hot 100 chart and number 12 on the US Billboard Hot R&B/Hip-Hop Singles & Tracks chart. In Australia, the song was released twice: once as a solo single and again as a double A-side with "Incomplete" in 2001, when it reached the top 30.

Music video
The music video for the song was directed by Hype Williams and features Sisqó singing the song on top of a building then goes straight to Make It Hot's performance with clips of Sisqó playing a guitar. The video ends with Sisqó dancing with women.

Track listings

Credits and personnel
Credits adapted from the liner notes of Unleash the Dragon.

Recording locations
 The Tracken Place, LA, CA
 Larrabee West, LA, CA

Personnel
 Mixed By – Manny Marroquin
 Producer – Sisqo The Golden Child for Da Ish Entertainment and Al West
 Recorded By – Jan Fairchild
 Written By – Mark Andrews & Al West

Weekly charts

Weekly charts

Year-end charts

Release history

References

Sisqó songs
1999 debut singles
1999 songs
Music videos directed by Hype Williams
Songs written by Sisqó